Filip Peeters or Philip Peeters (born 2 December 1962) is a Flemish actor. He is well known for his work in the television series Salamander as Paul Gerardi and Zone Stad as Didier Francks. He is one of a few Flemish actors who have been credited internationally.

He initially trained as a chef, however he found a talent in acting and attended the Studio Herman Teirlinck drama school. Since leaving the institute, he has starred in numerous Dutch, Belgian and German television programmes.

Filmography
Unit 13 (1997) - rijkswachter
Recht op Recht (1998-2002) - Hugo Van Eyck
Iedereen Beroemd! (2000)
Team Spirit (film)|Team Spirit (2000)
De Stilte van het Naderen (2000)
Baby (2002)
Resistance (2003)
Briefgeheim (film) (2010) - Kolonel Brandsema
Team Spirit 2 (2003)
Buitenspel (film) (2005)
De Hel van Tanger (2006)
Vermist (film) (2007)
Soeur Sourire (2009) - Antoine Brusson
Dossier K (2009) - Hoofdcommissaris De Keyser
De Texas Rakkers (2009) - stem Jerom
Penoza (2010) - Christian Schiller
Brasserie Romantiek (2012) - Paul
Salamander (2012-2013, 2018) - Paul Gerardi
Zone Stad (2013) - Didier
Smoorverliefd (2013) - Theo
The White Knights (2015) - Lieutenant Reykart
Michiel de Ruyter (2015)
The Missing (Series 2) (2016) - Kristian Herz

Personal life
Peeters studied at the Herman Teirlinck institute. He lives in Boechout with his wife, Flemish actress An Miller, and has two children.

Awards
 Best Actor Flemish Entertainment Award - 2009
 Best Actor Award at the Montréal World Film Festival - 2006
 Shooting Stars Award at the Berlinale - 2001

References

External links
 Official website
 

1962 births
Living people
Flemish male television actors
People from Anderlecht
20th-century Belgian male actors
21st-century Belgian male actors